Ayanna Williams is an American who holds the world record for the longest fingernails ever reached on a single hand for a woman, with a combined length of 576.4 centimeters (181.09 inches). She is also ranked second in the list of having longest fingernails in the world considering both genders, just behind India's Shridhar Chillal who had a combined length of 1000.6 centimeters (358.1 inches). Ayanna was awarded the Guinness World Record in 2018 for being the woman with the longest finger nails in the world.

Biography 
Ayanna pursued her interest in growing nails and engaged in nail art during her young age as a kid. She spent over 2 months to grow her nails without cutting them. Although proud of her record-breaking nails, Ayanna has faced increasing difficulties due to the weight of her finger nails. She found difficulties when engaging in day-to-day activities such as washing plates, dishes and putting sheets on bed.

In 2021, she decided to cut her nails. On 9 April 2021, she had her fingernails cut by Allison Readinger of Trinity Vista Dermatology using an electronic rotary power tool at the Ripley's Believe It or Not! museum in New York City, where the nails had been put on display for public.

The nails were measured for one last time in 2021 and the reading marked as 733.55 centimeters (240.7 inches) before cutting them down.

See also 

 Lee Redmond, who held the record for the longest fingernails on both hands.

References 

Living people
People from Texas
People from Houston
World record holders
Biological records
Year of birth missing (living people)